"There You Were" is a song recorded by Canadian country music artist John Landry. It was released in 1999 as the first single from his debut album, Forever Took Too Long. It peaked at number 7 on the RPM Country Tracks chart in April 1999.

Chart performance

Year-end charts

References

1999 songs
John Landry songs
1999 debut singles